Sammy Johnson (September 22, 1952) is a former professional American football player who played running back for six seasons for the San Francisco 49ers, Minnesota Vikings, and Green Bay Packers

References

1952 births
American football running backs
Minnesota Vikings players
San Francisco 49ers players
Green Bay Packers players
North Carolina Tar Heels football players
Living people
People from Burlington, North Carolina